Serzedelo is a Portuguses Freguesia in the Municipality of Póvoa de Lanhoso, with an area of 10.75 km² and 723 inhabitants (2011).

Population

References 

Freguesias of Póvoa de Lanhoso